Nanyang Junior College (NYJC) is a junior college in Singapore next to Lorong Chuan MRT station, offering two-year pre-university courses leading up to the GCE Advanced Level examinations.

In recent years, Nanyang Junior College has witnessed tremendous rise in its admission standards, establishing the institution as one of the top junior colleges in Singapore based on entry points. For the past decade, the college has nurtured six Public Service Commission (PSC) Scholarship holders.

History

Foundation years 
Nanyang Junior College was founded in 1977 as Lorong Chuan Junior College. It was among the first government-aided junior colleges to be established in Singapore. The building committee led by Mr Goh Tjoei Kok was formed in 1972. Construction of the college begun in 1976 with funding and support from the Singapore Chinese Chamber of Commerce and Industry (SCCCI), which concurrently oversees the establishment of Hwa Chong Junior College, Singapore's second junior college and first government-aided junior college.

The college was renamed as Nanyang Junior College in December 1977. The name "Nanyang" refers to the "Southern Seas" in Mandarin Chinese. The term was widely used by the mainland Chinese people to refer to the region encompassed by Singapore, Malaysia and the Southeast Asian region. The name is a reflection of the origins of Singapore having been built by immigrants predominantly from China, India, Malaysia, as well as other parts of the world.

The first cohort of about six hundred Arts and Science students, was enrolled in January 1978. Academic lessons were temporarily conducted at the former Westlake Secondary School campus. Construction of the major buildings and facilities at the permanent site along Serangoon Avenue 3 was completed in November 1978, and started administrative and academic operations the following month. Commerce stream and computer science was introduced into the college in 1979 and 1981 respectively. In 1981, Nanyang Junior College organised the 11th Pre-university Seminar in conjunction with the Ministry of Education.

As the campus of Nanyang Junior College was built on a small ridge, fog often covered part of the college in the 1980s and 1990s. Thus, the College was well known affectionately as "白云岗" (Chinese: Literal meaning "White Cloud Ridge"). This is also the inspiration for the brand-name of the college's Chinese Cultural Society's annual drama production, "我们的白云岗" (Chinese: Literal meaning "Our White Cloud Ridge").

Transformation into a modern institution 
On 21 May 1995, the College Resource Centre was opened. The three-storey building housed the Resource Library, the Computer Centre, the AVA Room and seminar rooms. In 1997, Nanyang Junior College was selected to be the second college in Singapore to offer the Art Elective Programme (AEP). From 15 January 1999, Nanyang Junior College joined Hwa Chong Junior College and Temasek Junior College as the third pre-university centre in Singapore to offer the Chinese Language Elective Programme (C-LEP). This came as a recognition of the efforts made by the college in maintaining its Chinese heritage and culture since its founding.
Nanyang Junior College was selected by Ministry of Education in 2000 for an on-site re-development of its campus under the PRIME project. in which the Ministry of Education bored 95 per cent of the re-development costs. The three-phrase re-development work included construction of a new main building, which feature new science and computer laboratories, a new library, and four new lecture theatres. Lessons and administrative operations continued in the old building and subsequently in temporary tutorial rooms and offices as the works were carried out between 2001 and 2004. The reconstruction works were briefly halted in 2003 due to the bankruptcy of the main contractor, which also affected a number of residential developments in Marine Terrace. The college moved into the newly re-developed campus building in January 2004, and officially declared the completion of the redevelopment works in June 2005. A stone feature, on which wrote "饮水思源" was donated by Mdm Ho Won Ho on her retirement as the principal of Nanyang Junior College in 2005.

In 2006, the school's executive committee proposed a change to the school's name as: "Chung Cheng Junior College", to signify the affiliation of Nanyang Junior College with Chung Cheng High (Main) and Chung Cheng High (Yishun). This proposition is overwhelmingly rejected by the alumni and staff, as well as prominent academics, stating of the strong college heritage, as well as the political sensitivity of the name "Chung Cheng (中正)". In an academic article featured in Lianhe Zaobao in 2002, it was stated that the adoption of the name "Nanyang" in 1978 was resulted of the strong objection by the society, due to the strong historical association of the name "Chung Cheng" to Kuomintang's founding leader Chiang Kai-shek, even with the clarifications made in a historical statement in 1940.

Accreditation of niche 
In 2009, Nanyang Junior College became the first institution to offer direct admission to Peking University to all junior college students in Singapore. The direct admission comprises a preliminary interview conducted by the college, as well as interview by the university's admission department in Singapore. The admission route simplified the overseas application process into the renowned Chinese university from Singapore, allowing prospective Singapore junior college students to participate in the university's annual international students admission exercise without travelling abroad.

In 2013, Nanyang Junior College hosted the Pre-University Seminar for the second time with a refreshed format that brought student ownership and thought leadership to the forefront. This was a departure from the traditional format where students prepared presentations in teams from their individual institutions. In 2014, Nanyang Junior College became one of the first junior colleges to offer Translation for the Singapore-Cambridge GCE Advanced Level examination to students with interest to develop proficiency in translation. This forms part of the prospectus by the Ministry of Education to boost bilingualism in tertiary education.

Principal

School identity and culture
The college was also well known for its closed kilted ties and homely culture, being described as "a homely college with a kampung feel" in a local article in 1992.

Insignia and motto
Nanyang Junior College's insignia is a red shield incorporating a blue base with four yellow crescents, which bears a head of a white lion. The white lion over the red background symbolises the courage and confidence to strive for excellence in the face of challenge, as portrayed by the waves in blue, which physically represents the literal meaning of the name "Nanyang (Southern Ocean) ". The white lion also portrays the quality to challenge convention as a leader, as a symbol of distinction. The colour of red is symbolic of the brotherhood the multi-cultural society as well as the developmental aspect of the nation, as portrayed by the four crescents.

Anthem and Pledge
Nanyang Junior College's anthem was originally composed in Mandarin Chinese with complementary English verses and was first performed in 1978. The full anthem consists of three verses, emphasizing the college ethos of strength through unity. It incorporates the defining symbols of the college, namely the palm trees and the original fountain of the old building. The symbolic verse "a rising fountain" is also a reflection of the auspicious name of the estate, Lorong Chuan, which meant fountain of wealth and prosperity. Presently, the English version of the anthem is sung during assemblies and college functions, with the omission of the third verse.

The college pledge was introduced in 2007 as part of the college's 30th anniversary.

Uniform
Male students wear plain beige-coloured shirts with beige pants. Female students wear beige-coloured blouses, beige skirts, and occasionally, at their discretion, shorts underneath the skirts. The former uniform, which was of a deeper brown, was completely phased out in 2008. The collar pin, which bears the college insignia, is worn on the left collar of the shirt. Dark brown blazers and school ties are worn on special occasions. The attire for PE is a college T-shirt with blue and white shoulder stripes and black shorts which bear the school initials.

In 2012, two dress-down days were introduced (Wednesdays and Fridays). This was accompanied by the introduction of the college polo T-shirts. Apart from the class, CCA T-shirts, students could wear the college polo T-shirts and school event T-shirts as part of the official college uniform. The formerly popular college house T-shirts were later ruled out to boost college cohesiveness and prevent segregation. In 2013, the number of dress-down days was increased to 4 (except for Wednesdays)

Student Welfare
Nanyang Junior College is one of the few colleges in Singapore not allocating an 'S' to Science classes and 'A' to Arts classes since the new curriculum was introduced in 2006, opting instead to avoid such labels to foster a greater sense of college spirit. It is also one of the few junior colleges in Singapore that do not hold morning assemblies at the conventional 7.30 am or 7.40 am. Assemblies are held at 8.30 am on Tuesdays, Wednesdays and Fridays for first year students, and on Mondays, Wednesdays and Thursdays for second-year students. Students will report to school by 8.25 am on these days. On the remaining days, there are no assembly and students may report at 8.50 am.

Admission and Affiliation
Nanyang Junior College admits students annually through the Joint Admission Exercise (JAE), as well as through Direct School Admission (DSA). The College also admits international students through a qualifying test, as well as international scholarship holders applied through the Ministry of Education.

Nanyang Junior College is affiliated with Chung Cheng High School (Main) and Chung Cheng High School (Yishun), which share the same School Management Committee. Students from both affiliated institutions are entitled to two additional point reduction to their L1R5 raw scores for their GCE Ordinary Level examination results when applying for admission into NYJC (a maximum of 4 reduction points to L1R5 score is allowed for JC Joint Admission Exercise, with the exception for appeals through Language Elective Programmes, which allows up to a maximum of 6 reduction points). In the 1980s to 2000s, Nanyang Junior College shared its leadership and immersion programmes with its two affiliated high schools. Plans were initially drafted for the relocation of Chung Cheng High School (Branch) to relocate adjacent to Nanyang Junior College from River Valley in 2001. The plan was shaved due to government objection and the school was eventually relocated to Yishun in 2003.

Campus

Nanyang Junior College's campus was built on a hilly ridge off Lorong Chuan, and underwent a redevelopment in the 2000s to keep up with the changes to the academic and non-academic curriculum.

The campus is designed to incorporate natural ventilation and lighting, as well as seamless accessibility for the disabled. The main block is characterised by its iconic circular foyer which features the college fountain and houses three lecture theatres beneath. The staff room, library and computer laboratories are built around the foyer. The fourth and largest lecture theatre, has a seating capacity of 600, and is equipped with stage facilities. All lecture theatres and mass lesson venues are installed with tables catered to left-handers. The college features study benches scattered in abundance around the school, allowing students to study under a quiet environment aside the library.

The college is open during the weekends and public holidays, and allows students to study in tutorial rooms through a booking system.

Academic information 
Nanyang Junior College offers Arts and Science courses that leads up to the Singapore-Cambridge GCE Advanced Level examinations.

As a student-centered junior college, NYJC is quoted locally as the most flexible college in terms of its availability of subject combinations, and allowing deserving students to undertake elective programmes even without relevant backgrounds. The college consistently performed well above national standards for the GCE A Level examination since the 1980s. The college was consistently ranked as the top-performing mid-tier junior colleges and the seventh in national ranking throughout the 1990s. 

Starting in the 2000s, under the leadership of the then principal Kwek Hiok Chuang, Nanyang Junior College has ascended to one of the tier 1 JCs in Singapore, being one of the top 3 JCs based on cut-off-points, median A Level rank-point, and the number of students who go on to win prestigious scholarships. NYJC has come into prominence for its steady rise among colleges with the most competitive academic achievements, faring well above the national average for most subjects at the annual GCE A Level examination. 

The college is popular with students given its forward-looking school culture; for example, students are given flexibility with their dress code. This was also reflected by the growing selectivity and increasingly stringent entry requirements for applicants year-on-year. As of 2019, NYJC is now the most selective junior college in Singapore.

Academic subjects

Language Elective Programme
As a ministry designated Cluster Centre of Excellence for Chinese Language, Nanyang Junior College offers the Chinese Language Elective Programme (C-LEP, or 语特) since 1999. To date, it has produced many outstanding graduates across various fields of work.

The ministry headed programme encompasses many inter-school enrichment activities and initiatives among the five participating institutions, aimed to enhance students’ learning and cultivate a deeper interest in Chinese language and culture. These include dedicated lecture series, camp, oversea immersion trips, editing and publishing of literary works, as well as internships. In NYJC, this inter-school programme is complemented by the NYJC LEP Programme, which include school-based enrichments such as production of the annual play  "我们的白云岗" (Chinese: Literal meaning "Our White Cloud Ridge"), as well as organising the annual National Translation Competition. The college also award the NYJC Bicultural Award and the NYJC Award for Excellence-in-Chinese (or 传薪奖) to graduating students with outstanding performance and contribution.

Students are required to undertake H2 Chinese Language and Literature and a Chinese Language related subject to be eligible for the programme. As with other institutions offering the C-LEP, students under the programme enjoys two bonus points in their admission to Nanyang Junior College. Singaporean students are eligible for the two-year Chinese Language Elective Scholarship offered by the Ministry of Education.

Art Elective Programme
Nanyang Junior College offers the Art Elective Programme since 1997. The college is also one of the ministry designated Cluster Centre of Excellence for the Arts. The college is known for its strength in the teaching of arts and its egalitarian stance, accepting students that have a passion for arts but deprived of a considerable background.

Co-curricular activities
Nanyang Junior College offers a wide array of co-curricular activities, which students are given opportunities to work closely with their CCA tutors or trainers to attain goals and to initiate programmes that benefit the college and the community. Students are also given participate or initiate student-led interest groups (SIGs) as well as projects as part of their co-curricular activities. The college do not limit students to the number of co-curricular activities on the basis that the academic results is not adversely affected.

Nanyang Junior College is well known for its forte in Volleyball, Dragonboat, Table tennis, Performing Arts and Robotics. In 2017, the Volleyball Boy's and Girls' teams created history by becoming the first college to obtain both championship titles in the same year. Both teams repeated this feat in 2018 and 2019.

Student Council
The Student Council is formed by a group of 30 to 40 councillors elected by the student population. Headed by an executive committee, there are three committees in the Student Council – Student Affairs (SA), Welfare (Welco) and College Image and Bonding (CIB). Each committee discharges its own duties honourably. The Council also plans adhoc events such as The Nyght and major events, such as Orientation and Recruitment.

Class Leaders' Committee
The Class Leaders' Committee (CLC) (previously known as 'Civics Tutorial Congress') of NYJC is made up of all Class Leaders. The entire Class Leaders' Committee is governed by a body called the Class Leaders' Executive Committee (CLEXCO), which helps in disseminating all information to the Class Leaders, organising courses and camps for Class Leaders, planning and executing events in school.

Community outreach

JC Experience Day
Nanyang Junior College is the only college in Singapore that offer secondary school students opportunity to fully experience the junior college curriculum. Activities offered under the annual event includes stimulated lessons for subjects of choice, as well as immersion in selected co-curricular activities and student interest groups of the school.

Promoting Chinese language and bilingual learning
As one of the five institutions offering the Chinese Language Elective Programme (CLEP), Nanyang Junior College have been actively supporting initiatives and events that enhances the learning of Chinese Language as well as bi-cultural studies. Nanyang Junior College jointly organises the "National Translation Competition" annually with the Singapore Press Holdings as part of its curriculum outreach for the CLEP and Translation.

In 2017, Nanyang Junior College collaborated with the Committee to Promote Chinese Language Learning (CPCLL) as well as Singapore Press Holdings to hold the annual "Literature under the April Sky" event in its campus. The event included sharing of poetry arts by local and oversea writers and lecturers, as well as interactive activities and performances to promote the interest for the language in youths.

Student-Initiated Projects (SIP) 

Nanyang Junior College encourages every student to converge and initiate meaningful projects of any cause and format, and features a committee to provide support and guidance to students throughout their course of project.

Support to community 
Nanyang Junior College is a distinguished institutional partner with the Chinese Development Assistance Council (CDAC), Singapore Indian Development Association (SINDA) and Yayasan Mendaki, which provide assistance to needy families and individuals of the Chinese, Indian and Malay community respectively. Nanyang Junior College is also the distinguished venue sponsor for the annual "Back to School" event organised by the CDAC, which is aimed to provide schooling aid to students from low income families and promote family bonding through workshops, seminars and carnival activities. The event held in December 2017, which benefited more than 12'000 students from 6'500 families, was graced by President Mdm Halimah Yacob, as well as Minister for Education (Higher Education and Skills) Mr Ong Ye Kung who is also the chairman of the CDAC.

In popular culture
Nanyang Junior College is featured as the main scene for a school setting in various local drama series production, including While We Are Young (also known as Z世代 ), a 20 episode Singaporean drama produced and telecast on Mediacorp Channel 8 in 2017. In the production, the college was portrayed as one of nation's top junior colleges "Zhuo Yue Junior College".

Alumni

Nanyang Junior College Alumni Association
Nanyang Junior College Alumni Association was the official alumni body of Nanyang Junior College, registered on 15 June 1988. The association is aimed to strengthen ties between the graduates, as well as with current students, former and present staffs. It also serve as a partner of the college in initiatives and programmes in relation to students' all-round development. For instance, the association introduced the NY Achiever Award to be given on College Day to students who have excelled in both their studies and in community service, as a complement to the leadership development curriculum of the college.

Notable alumni

Transport
 Neo Kian Hong: CEO, SMRT Corporation

Medicine
 Lim Kah Leong: Senior Research Scientist (adjunct), National Neuroscience Institute; Associate Professor, Dept of Physiology, National University of Singapore; Associate Professor, Duke-NUS Graduate Medical School

Politics
 Muhammad Faishal Ibrahim: Parliamentary Secretary, Ministry of Health & Ministry of Transport; Member of Parliament, Nee Soon GRC
 Teo Ser Luck: Former Member of Parliament, Pasir Ris-Punggol GRC
 Chia Kiah Hong, Steve: Former secretary-general, National Solidarity Party
 Yeo Guat Kwang: Former Member of Parliament, Ang Mo Kio GRC
 Ng Phek Hoong Irene: Former Member of Parliament, Tampines GRC
 James Gomez: Former Member, Singapore Democratic Party

Arts 

 Sarah Choo Jing: Multidisciplinary fine artist

Gallery

External links

 
 Nanyang Junior College Alumni Association

References

 
Junior colleges in Singapore
Buildings and structures in Serangoon
1978 establishments in Singapore
Education in North-East Region, Singapore
Educational institutions established in 1977